Pedro González Zavala (born 19 May 1943) is a Peruvian football midfielder who played for Peru in the 1970 FIFA World Cup. He also played for Universitario de Deportes.

References

External links
FIFA profile

1943 births
Peruvian footballers
Peru international footballers
Association football midfielders
Club Universitario de Deportes footballers
1970 FIFA World Cup players
Living people